The Monthly Register and encyclopedian magazine was a British periodical published from 1802 to 1803 that was published by Charles and John Wyatt and edited by John Dyer Collier (1762–1825), the father of John Payne Collier, and  Henry Crabb Robinson's essays on Kant – amongst the very earliest notices of Kant in England – appeared there.

References

Magazines established in 1802
Magazines disestablished in 1803
Defunct magazines published in the United Kingdom
1802 establishments in the United Kingdom